Brian Leslie Norman Kennett  (born 7 May 1948 in Croydon, Surrey, UK) is a mathematical physicist and seismologist. He is now a professor emeritus at the Australian National University.

Education and career
Kennett graduated in Theoretical Physics at the University of Cambridge with a first class bachelor's degree in 1969 and then took the Mathematical Tripos Part III achieving Honours with Distinction in 1970. He received his Ph.D in theoretical seismology from the Department of Applied Mathematics and Theoretical Physics in 1973. He was a Research Fellow of Emmanuel College, Cambridge from 1972 to 1976. As a postdoc, he was at the University of California, San Diego from 1974 to 1975, before returning in 1975 to the University of Cambridge, where he was a lecturer until he moved to Australia. In 1984, Kennett joined the Research School of Earth Sciences of the Australian National University (ANU) where he established a strong observational and theoretical program in seismology. He was a visiting scientist at, among other places, the University of Tokyo in 2002 and the Ludwig Maximilian University of Munich in 2009. From 2006 to 2010 he was director of the Research School of Earth Sciences of the ANU.

Kennett was elected in 1988 a Fellow of the American Geophysical Union and in 1996 an Honorary Fellow of the Royal Astronomical Society. From 1999 to 2003, he was President of the International Association of Seismology and Physics of the Earth’s Interior (IASPEI). He was elected as a Fellow of the Australian Academy of Science in 1994 and as a Fellow of the Royal Society of London in 2005.

Kennett has made significant contributions to research on the Earth's internal structure. His theoretical work on the form of seismograms and their application (e.g., seismic tomography) has contributed to the study of the Earth's mantle, particularly in Australia. He has developed comprehensive models of propagation velocities of seismic waves that serve as a basis for determining the epicenter of an earthquake, including the  model and the  model.

Awards and honours
 1972 Smith Prize of the University of Cambridge
 1981 Adams Prize of the University of Cambridge and St John's College, Cambridge
 1994 Fellow of the Australian Academy of Science
 2004 Humboldt Prize of the Alexander von Humboldt Foundation
 2005 Jaeger Medal of the Australian Academy of Science
 2005 Fellow of Royal Society
 2006 Murchison Medal of the Geological Society of London
 2007 Beno Gutenberg Medal of the European Geosciences Union (EGU)
 2008 Gold Medal of the Royal Astronomical Society for Geophysics
 2011 Matthew Flinders Medal and Lecture of the Australian Academy of Science
 2017 Inge Lehmann Medal of the American Geophysical Union

Books
 
as editor with Frode Ringdal: 

 with Hans-Peter Bunge: 
 
with Erdinç Saygin, Tanya Fomin, and Richard Blewett:

References

External links
 Brian Kennett, ResearchGate (researchgate.net)

1948 births
Living people
Alumni of the University of Cambridge
Academic staff of the Australian National University
Seismologists
Fellows of the Royal Society
Fellows of the Australian Academy of Science
Officers of the Order of Australia
Recipients of the Gold Medal of the Royal Astronomical Society